Jordan Neil Greenidge (born 5 January 2000) is an English professional footballer who plays as a forward for Tonbridge Angels on loan from Hemel Hempstead Town.

Career
Formerly of Stoke City, in July 2018 Greenidge joined Cypriot First Division side Omonia on a three-year deal. On 24 September 2018, he made his professional debut coming on as a substitute for the final six minutes in place of Cris Montes in a 1–0 loss away to AEK Larnaca.

On 17 January 2019, he left Omonia after just one appearance. and two weeks later he joined Spanish Segunda División B side Badajoz.

In August 2021 he joined League Two Newport County on a one year contract after impressing in pre-season trials.  He made his debut for Newport on 10 August 2021 in the starting line-up for the 1–0 EFL Cup first round win against Ipswich Town. Greenidge scored his first goal for Newport on 12 October 2021 in the 4–3 EFL Trophy defeat to Arsenal Under-21's. On 6 January 2022 Newport terminated Greenidge's contract by mutual consent 

On 15 January 2022, Greenidge signed for Weymouth.

On 8 March 2022, Greenidge signed for Dartford on loan from the rest of the 2021–22 season.

On 15 July 2022, Greenidge signed for Hemel Hempstead Town.

On 19 November 2022, Greenidge signed for Tonbridge Angels on an initial month's loan.

On 19 December 2022, after scoring three league goals in his first four games, and a hat trick in a FA Trophy game, Greenidge's loan was extended until 8 February 2023.

Personal life
His brother Reiss Greenidge currently plays for Maidstone United having previously played for Bolton Wanderers.

References

External links
 
 
 

2000 births
Living people
Footballers from Enfield, London
English footballers
English people of Guyanese descent
Association football forwards
English expatriate footballers
AC Omonia players
CD Badajoz players
Newport County A.F.C. players
Weymouth F.C. players
Dartford F.C. players
Hemel Hempstead Town F.C. players
Tonbridge Angels F.C. players
Cypriot First Division players
Segunda División B players
Expatriate footballers in Spain
Expatriate footballers in Cyprus
English expatriate sportspeople in Spain
English expatriate sportspeople in Cyprus
English Football League players
National League (English football) players